The Cornell Ann S. Bowers College of Computing and Information Science, known as Cornell Bowers CIS for short, is an entity within Cornell University.  The college comprises the Department of Computer Science, the Department of Information Science, and the Department of Statistics and Data Science.  However, as Cornell computer science professor David Gries has explained, "essentially it's a college without students," with students instead being admitted to, and coming from, three of Cornell's regular undergraduate schools: the College of Engineering, the College of Arts and Sciences, and the College of Agriculture and Life Sciences.  A variety of degree programs are offered through the college, depending upon the department within the college and the originating college the student is in; the degrees granted include   Bachelor of Arts and Bachelor of Science; Master of Science, Master of Engineering, and Master of Professional Studies; and PhD.  In addition, students from any of Cornell's seven different undergraduate schools can minor in computer science or information science. 

By 2022, there were 2,000 students taking majors in the college, and 76 percent of all undergraduate students were taking at least one course in CIS.  The college is located in Bill & Melinda Gates Hall near the Engineering Quadrangle on the Cornell Central Campus in Ithaca, New York.  A new building is planned to help accommodate the rapidly increasing enrollments in CIS subjects.  The inaugural dean of the college is Kavita Bala.

Faculty of Computing and Information Science 
The college came out of the Faculty of Computing and Information Science, which was established in 1999 to unify computer science-related efforts throughout the university.  The initiative, done under the university presidency of Hunter R. Rawlings III, overcame early opposition from many professors in both the Engineering and Arts schools.  The new faculty's first dean was Robert L. Constable, a longtime professor of computer science at Cornell who specialized in connecting computer programs with mathematical proof systems.  The idea of the entity, which Constable had been one of the primary advocates for, was to elevate computer science from the department level to the college level; this was seen as critical given the field's increasingly widespread importance to nearly every area of study at the university.  Furthermore, the information science side of the faculty would focus on how computer-related technology was affecting society and the world.  

In 2005, the Department of Statistical Science was incorporated into the faculty.  A $25 million donation from the Bill & Melinda Gates Foundation in 2006 led to the construction of the building named after couple, which opened in 2014.  Other CIS facilities include Rhodes Hall, as well as Malott Hall.

Constable would remain as the faculty's dean for ten years.  When he stepped down from the post, Provost Biddy Martin said that Constable had succeeded in giving computing reach into areas as different as architecture, history, plant science, and psychology.  He was succeeded as dean by Daniel P. Huttenlocher.

According to Cornell professors and administrators, the Faculty of Computing and Information Science was a "pioneer" in devising this structure, and other universities have since emulated aspects of it.  In particular, other institutions began tying computer science and information science more closely together.  Huttenlocher took the interdisciplinary approach of the Faculty of Computing and Information Science  to his next position, at Cornell Tech, and then in the late 2010s he became the first dean of the MIT Schwarzman College of Computing at the Massachusetts Institute of Technology, which also emphasized an interdisciplinary perspective that emphasized the impacts of computing technology on society.

As an example of how the Faculty of Computing and Information Science emphasized the value of multidisciplinary studies, one initiative of the faculty was to support double majors between computer science and a variety of other subjects in any of the Arts, Engineering, or Agriculture schools.  This proved successful in increasing the number of women who were computer science majors.  Indeed, by 2020 some 43 percent of students majoring in CIS were female, a figure well above typical for the United States.
The final dean of the faculty was Kavita Bala, who had been chair of the department of computer science and was named to the position in 2020.  Then when the college was created later that year, she became the first dean of it.

Formation of the college 
Creation of the college came in December 2020 with a more-than-$100 million donation from Ann S. Bowers.
Bowers, a liberal arts alumnus of Cornell, had been the head of personnel at Intel during a period of rapid growth in the early 1970s; subsequently married Robert Noyce, the cofounder of Intel; was vice president for human resources at Apple Computer in the early 1980s; and later became a philanthropist who chaired the Noyce Foundation following her husband's death. She had frequently donated to Cornell in the past.

An additional new building is planned, helped by a $10 million donation from the two founders of Wayfair, both Cornell alumni, as well as from Bowers.  By late 2022, plans were underway to break ground on the new building, with construction scheduled to begin in 2023 and conclude in 2025.  The new structure is designed by Leers Weinzapfel Associates and would be built adjacent to Gates Hall, with green space located in between to form a mini-quad.  Construction would be on the site of Hoy Field, the longtime varsity baseball team diamond (which will be relocated further out from the central campus, at some loss of convenience and tradition).  The new building is intended to help handle a factor-of-six increase in computer and information science enrollments during the previous decade.   That increase has led to situations where faculty and other staff are spread across campus and non-majors are not permitted to take upper-level computer science courses, both of which the new building could ameliorate.

Graduate student programs in the college take place both in Ithaca and at the Cornell Tech campus in New York City.  

By 2022 there were 62 full-time faculty members in the Department of Computer Science, with 49 in Ithaca and 13 in New York City.  There were 42 full-time faculty in the Department of Information Science, and 18 tenure or tenure-track positions in the Department of Statistics and Data Science.

Rankings 
Cornell has long had one of the top-ranked computer science programs in the nation.  It placed in a tie for sixth overall in the U.S. News & World Report Best Colleges Rankings for 2022, with specialty rankings of third in theory, third in programming languages, tied for fifth in artificial intelligence, and twelfth in computer systems.  

Cornell ranked in a tie for thirteenth in statistics in the same 2022 rankings.

References

External links 
 Official website

Computing and Information Science
Computing and Information Science
1999 establishments in New York (state)
Educational institutions established in 1999
Engineering schools and colleges in the United States
Engineering universities and colleges in New York (state)